The Kentucky Minstrels were a team formed under the leadership of Duncan Bruce to study a scheme during World War II to cover the River Thames with soot in order to conceal it from German Bombers. Work began on the Thames in a craft inappropriately named H.M.S. Persil.

References 

United Kingdom home front during World War II
Military deception during World War II
Military history of the United Kingdom during World War II
1940s in London